Latinos Beyond Reel is a documentary which was released on February 23, 2013. Latinos Beyond Reel taps into the harsh reality of Latino representation in the media industry.  Latinos Beyond Reel was directed by Miguel Picker and Chyng-Feng Sun. Latinos Beyond Reel is under The Media Education Foundation (MEF). The Media Education Foundation (MEF) produced and distributed the film. The film talks about the underrepresentation and marginalization of Latinos in the U.S media. The film also talks about the effects the false representation of Latinos in the media industry has on youth. Latinos Beyond Reel captures the most unfortunate portrayal of Latinos in the media ranging from off-screen roles to animated characters in film and television.

During the film, the audience dives deep into the minds of children, who view every day, the poor representation of Latinos in the media. The children in the film claim that they have never seen a Hispanic superhero in the media and that all of the protagonists are white. One boy in the film refers to all of the protagonists portrayed in the media as "American". The boy calling all of the protagonists American shows the detachment that Latinos, and many other races or demographics, feel from the society and culture in America.

Summary 

The film digs deep into a look at media in America’s society from the perspective of Latinos. The film talks about how the Latino actors and actress' have only marginalized roles in the media such as maids, over-sexualized women, and thieves. Latinos Beyond Reel discusses how Latino men are always cast as the antagonists in films and television shows, and women often play the role of a maid. One actress Lupe Ontiveros, who was discussed in the film, has been quoted in previous articles saying she has played the role of a maid more than 150 times. Lupe Ontivernos' experience as playing a maid more than 150 times puts the Latino underrepresentation into perspective.

At one point in the film, actor Yancey Arias talks about how what is written specifically in the script will stay in the film no matter how much an actor wants to stray away from the script. When Yancey Arias talks about how what is in the script will be on the screen, he is talking about himself going away from the stereotypes the writers and directors portray of him. Yancey Arias talks about how he tries to change his acting for a role so he, as a Latino, doesn't seem like as much of an antagonist as he is made out to be. Still, all of the things Yancey Arias would do to try and stay away from Latino stereotypes would not be added into the film because someone behind the scenes would want to keep the Latino portrayal as a negatively portrayed character.

The documentary also explores some of the recent positive shows and the impacts they are having on society. Some prime examples of sitcoms that portray Latinos in a positive light are Dora the Explorer, George Lopez, and Ugly Betty. It is also said that some actress still plays the overhyped Latino stereotypical role. Sofia Vergara of Modern Family is one of the most well-known Hispanic actors of all time and still, plays that Latino stereotype. Since so many people view Sofia Vergara as a staple of Latino culture when she plays the stereotypes, people believe they are true. The documentary gets at the fact that Latino roles are marginalized on and off camera.

Latinos Beyond Reel uses key statistics to explain why Latinos should be more of a target market in consumerism. Latinos make up a large portion of the population yet, makes up a small portion of the advertising market. The explanation of how much Latinos consume and spend is also discussed in this documentary.

Interviews 

Interviews in the documentary Latinos Beyond Reel include:

Yancey Arias
Moctesuma Esparza
Juan Gonzalez (journalist)
Hector Herrera
Lillian Jimenez 
Dennis E. Leoni
Josefina López
Alex Nogales
Luis Antonio Ramos 
Mari Castañeda, and many more.

See also
The Bronze Screen: 100 Years of the Latino Image in Hollywood (film)

References 

2013 films
Documentary films about racism in the cinema of the United States
Documentary films about Latin America